The following are the worldwide association football events of the year 1982.

Events 
 February 7 – The first ever Arab Club Champions Cup is completed, with Al-Shorta of Iraq winning the title with a 4–2 aggregate win over Al-Nejmeh of Lebanon.
 March 14 – Johannes Atlason makes his debut as the manager of Iceland, when the team draws (0-0) against Kuwait.
 May 26 – European Cup won by Aston Villa after defeating Bayern Munich 1-0 in Rotterdam, Netherlands.
 June 13 – The 1982 FIFA World Cup kicks off in Spain. For the first time, 24 teams compete in the final tournament, with the competition eventually won by Italy.
 June 30 – Dutch club SC Amersfoort is disestablished due to financial problems.
September 15 – HFC Haarlem makes a winning European debut with by defeating Belgium's AA Gent (2-1) in the first round of the UEFA Cup. The goals for the Dutch side are scored by Gerrie Kleton and Martin Haar.
 October 20 – 66 fans lost their life in the Luzhniki disaster during the UEFA Cup second round match between FC Spartak Moscow and HFC Haarlem in Moscow.
 November 30 – Copa Libertadores won by Peñarol after defeating Cobreloa on an aggregate score of 1-0.

Winners club national championship

Asia
  – Al-Rayyan

Europe
  – Standard Liège
  – CSKA Sofia
  – Dukla Prague
  – Odense Boldklub
  – Berliner FC Dynamo
  – Liverpool
 - FC Kuusysi
  – AS Monaco
  – Olympiacos
  – Juventus
 
 Eredivisie – Ajax Amsterdam
 Eerste Divisie – Helmond Sport
  – Widzew Łódź
  – Sporting CP
  – Celtic
  – Dinamo Minsk
  – Real Sociedad
  – Grasshopper Club Zürich
  – Beşiktaş
  – Hamburger SV
  – Dinamo Zagreb

North America
  – UNAL
 / :
 New York Cosmos (NASL)

Oceania
 – Sydney City

South America
 
Metropolitano – Estudiantes
Nacional – Ferro Carril Oeste
 Bolivia – Bolívar
  – Flamengo
  – América de Cali
  – Olimpia Asunción

International Tournaments 
British Home Championship (February 23 – May 29)

 African Cup of Nations in Libya (March 5–19)
  
  
  
 FIFA World Cup in Spain (June 13 – July 11)
  
  
  
 UEFA U-16 European Championship in Italy (May 5–7)
  
  
  
 UEFA U-18 European Championship in Finland
  
  
 UEFA U-21 European Championship

National Teams



Births 

 January 4 – Richard Logan, English club footballer
 January 8 – Emanuele Calaiò, Italian youth international
 January 22 – Fabricio Coloccini, Argentine international footballer
 January 31
 Andreas Görlitz, German international 
 Salvatore Masiello, Italian club footballer 
 Allan McGregor, Scottish international footballer
 February 2 – Rodrigo Palacio, Argentine international footballer
 February 10 – Jacek Gabrusewicz, Polish footballer
 February 11 – Thobo Kgoboge,  Botswanan footballer
 February 16 – Vasilios Genitsaridis, Greek former professional footballer
 April 1 – Robert Vittek, Slovakian international footballer
 April 2 – Marco Amelia, Italian international footballer
 April 6 – Nelson Geingob, Namibian former footballer
 April 28 – Álvaro Ricaldi, Bolivian international footballer
 May 5 – Przemysław Kaźmierczak, Polish international footballer
 May 17 – Dylan Macallister, Australian soccer player
 May 20 – Petr Čech, Czech international footballer
 June 4 – Pablo Darío López, Argentine footballer
 June 15 – Katie Chapman, English footballer
 June 26 – Rosdin Wasli, Malaysian clubfootballer
 July 2 – Alvito Rodrigues, Indian footballer
 July 5
 Fabrício de Souza, Brazilian footballer
 Julien Féret, French footballer
 Alberto Gilardino, Italian international footballer
 Paíto, Mozambican footballer
 Javier Paredes, Spanish footballer
 Szabolcs Perenyi, Romanian-Hungarian footballer
 July 7 – Jan Laštůvka, Czech footballer
 July 8 – David Kenga, Kenyan footballer
 July 10 – Sebastian Mila, Polish footballer
 July 12
 Antonio Cassano, Italian international footballer
 Gerardo Christian Hernández, professional Mexican footballer
 July 14 – Hermán Solíz, Bolivian footballer
 July 15 – Cristian Dănălache, Romanian footballer
 July 16 – Charles Kokougan, French former professional footballer
 July 25 – Ivan Len, Ukrainian professional footballer
 August 21 – Jayson Trommel, Dutch footballer
 August 24
 José Bosingwa, Portuguese international
 Kim Källström, Swedish international
 Glen Atle Larsen, Norwegian club footballer
 September 2 – Alan Tate, English club footballer
 September 12 – Kiran Bechan, Dutch footballer
 October 7 – Jermain Defoe, English international footballer
 October 9 – Antonio Manuel Viana Mendonça, Angolan footballer
 October 29 – Gerald Gansterer, Austrian footballer
 November 17 – – Otacílio Mariano Neto, Brazilian footballer
 December 1 – Lloyd Doyley, English defender and manager, Jamaican international
 December 8 – Halil Altıntop, Turkish international footballer
 December 8 – Hamit Altıntop, Turkish international footballer

Deaths

January
 January 3 – Fritz Laband, West-German defender, winner of the 1954 FIFA World Cup. (56)

August
 August 30 - Theodor Reimann (61), Slovak footballer  (born 1921)

September
 September 3 - Hércules de Miranda, Brazilian forward, semi-finalist at the 1938 FIFA World Cup. (70)
 September 14 - Vladislao Cap (48), Argentine footballer and manager (born 1934)

November
 November 8 - Jimmy Dickinson, English midfielder, England Squad member at the 1950 FIFA World Cup and the 1954 FIFA World Cup. (57, heart attack)
 November 17 - Felix von Heijden (92), Dutch footballer (born 1890)

December
 December 2 - Giovanni Ferrari, Italian midfielder, winner of the 1934 FIFA World Cup and 1938 FIFA World Cup and winner of the Serie A for a record 8 times as a player. (74)

References

External links
  Rec.Sport.Soccer Statistics Foundation
  VoetbalStats

 
Association football by year